Gästgivars is a Swedish farm in the Bollnäs Municipality and the province of Hälsingland. It is one of the seven decorated farms of Hälsingland which are collectively recognised by Unesco as a World Heritage Site.

Gallery

References 

Farms in Sweden
Hälsingland
Buildings and structures in Gävleborg County
World Heritage Sites in Sweden